The following is a  complete list of concertos by Christoph Graupner (1683-1760), the German harpsichordist and composer of high Baroque music.  The works appear as given in Christoph Graupner : Thematisches Verzeichnis der Musikalischen Werke (thematic catalogue of Graupner's instrumental works).

List of concertos
 GWV 301 — Bassoon Concerto in C major
 GWV 302 — Concerto for oboe d'amore in C major
 GWV 303 — Concerto for 2 chalumeaux in C major
 GWV 304 — Concerto for 2 violins in C major
 GWV 305 — Concerto for 2 flutes in C major
 GWV 306 — Concerto for chalumeau, bassoon and cello in C major
 GWV 307 — Bassoon Concerto in C minor
 GWV 308 — Trumpet Concerto in D major
 GWV 309 — Trumpet Concerto in D major
 GWV 310 — Flute Concerto in D major
 GWV 311 — Flute Concerto in D major
 GWV 312 — Flute Concerto in D major
 GWV 313 — Concerto for oboe d'amore in D major
 GWV 314 — Concerto for viola d'amore in D major
 GWV 315 — Concerto for 2 flutes in D major
 GWV 316 — Concerto for 2 flutes in D major
 GWV 317 — Concerto for viola d'amore & viola in D major
 GWV 318 — Concerto for 2 trumpets in D major
 GWV 319 — Concerto for 2 violins in E flat major
 GWV 320 — Flute Concerto in E major
 GWV 321 — Concerto for 2 flutes in E minor
 GWV 322 — Concerto for 2 flutes in E minor
 GWV 323 — Recorder Concerto in F major
 GWV 324 — Oboe Concerto in F major
 GWV 325 — Concerto for 2 chalumeaux in F major
 GWV 326 — Concerto for 2 oboes di selva in F major
 GWV 327 — Concerto for chalumeau, flute & viola d'amore in F major
 GWV 328 — Bassoon Concerto in G major
 GWV 329 — Flute Concerto in G major
 GWV 330 — Concerto for 2 flutes in G major
 GWV 331 — Concerto for 2 flutes in G major
 GWV 332 — Concerto for 2 horns in G major
 GWV 333 — Concerto for flauto d'amore, oboe d'amore & viola d'amore in G major
 GWV 334 — Concerto for 2 violins in G minor
 GWV 335 — Concerto for 2 violins in G minor
 GWV 336 — Concerto for viola d'amore in G minor
 GWV 337 — Violin Concerto in A major
 GWV 338 — Concerto for 2 violins in A major
 GWV 339 — Concerto for viola d'amore & viola in A major
 GWV 340 — Bassoon Concerto in B flat major
 GWV 341 — Concerto for 2 oboes in B flat major
 GWV 342 — Concerto for 2 oboes in B flat major
 GWV 343 — Concerto for chalumeau, oboe & viola d'amore in B flat major
 GWV 344 — Concerto for 2 flutes & 2 oboes in B flat major
 GWV 725 — Concerto for flute & viola d'amore in D minor
 GWV 726 — Concerto for viola d'amore in G major
 GWV 727 — Flute Concerto in A major
 GWV 728 — Concerto for flauto d'amore in A major

See also
 List of cantatas by Christoph Graupner
 List of symphonies by Christoph Graupner
 List of harpsichord pieces by Christoph Graupner
 List of orchestral suites by Christoph Graupner
 List of chamber pieces by Christoph Graupner

Selected discography
 Graupner: Ritratti a colori (Concertos). Antichi Strumenti, orchestra. (Stradivarius 33581)
 Graupner: Instrumental and vocal music Vol. 1. Les idées heureuses, orchestra. (Analekta 3162)
 Graupner: Instrumental and vocal music Vol. 2. Les idées heureuses, orchestra. (Analekta 3180)
 Graupner: Instrumental and vocal music Vol. 3. Les idées heureuses, orchestra. (Analekta 9115)

References

External links
Graupner GWV-online a digital Graupner Werkverzeichnis with integrated search function
The Christoph Graupner Society Homepage
Extensive online bibliography for research on Christoph Graupner
ULB Library  Graupner's music manuscripts and archives in Darmstadt, Germany
Kim Patrick Clow's webpage dedicated to promoting Graupner's work.

Concertos
Graupner, Christoph